Lecithasteridae is a family of trematodes belonging to the order Plagiorchiida.

Genera

Genera:
 Acanthuritrema Yamaguti, 1970
 Aponurus Looss, 1907
 Assitrema Parukhin, 1976

References

Plagiorchiida